Camden Square is a ward in the London Borough of Camden, in the United Kingdom. The ward represents an area centred on the square of the same name. The ward was first used for the 2022 Camden London Borough Council election, and elects two councillors to Camden London Borough Council. The ward covers an area previously part of the abolished Cantelowes ward, and a small part of the St Pancras and Somers Town ward. In 2018, the ward had an electorate of 5,652. The Boundary Commission projects the electorate to rise to 5,854 in 2025.

Election results

Elections in the 2020s

References

Wards of the London Borough of Camden
2022 establishments in England